Enzo Philibert (born 13 May 2002) is a French professional footballer who plays as a centre-back.

Club career
A youth product of Burel FC, Salon Bel Air and Bastia, Philibert began his senior career with the reserves of Nîmes in 2020. He made his professional debut with Nîmes  in a 2–0 Ligue 2 loss to Paris FC on 21 September 2021.

References

External links
 

2002 births
Living people
French footballers
Footballers from Marseille
Association football defenders
Ligue 2 players
Championnat National 3 players
Nîmes Olympique players